Jinniuhu station, is a metro station on Line S8 of the Nanjing Metro. It started operations on 1 August 2014.

References

Railway stations in Jiangsu
Railway stations in China opened in 2014
Nanjing Metro stations